Haiphong Carriage Company is a Vietnamese railcar manufacturer. The company supplies cars to Vietnam Railways.

Products

 Air-conditioned soft seat coach
 Hard berth coach  
 Berth coach 
 Double-deck car 
 Dining car 
 Civil service and generator car 
 Wagon G-G
 Container car 
 Composite car P 
 Covered car  
 Air suspension bogie
 Window car 
 Soft seat 
 Other spare parts

References

 

Rail vehicle manufacturers of Vietnam